The University of Illinois Department of Computer Science is the academic department encompassing the discipline of computer science at the University of Illinois at Urbana-Champaign. According to U.S. News & World Report, both its undergraduate and graduate programs rank in the top five among American universities. The department ranks equally high in faculty submissions to reputable journals and academic conferences, as determined by CSRankings.org. According to Computer Science Open Rankings, the department ranks equally high in placing Ph.D. students in tenure-track positions at top universities and winning best paper awards. From before its official founding in 1964 to today, the department's faculty members and alumni have contributed to projects including the ORDVAC, PLATO, Mosaic (web browser), JavaScript and LLVM, and have founded companies including Siebel Systems, Netscape, Mozilla, PayPal, Yelp, YouTube, and Malwarebytes.

History
In 1949, the University of Illinois created the Digital Computer Laboratory following the joint funding between the university and the U.S. Army to create the ORDVAC and ILLIAC I computers under the direction of physicist Ralph Meagher. The ORDVAC and ILLIAC computers the two earliest von-Neumann architecture machines to be constructed. Once completed in 1952, the ILLIAC I inspired machines such as the MISTIC, MUSASINO-1, SILLIAC, and CYCLONE, as well as providing the impetus for the university to continue its research in computing through the ILLIAC II project. Yet despite such advances in high-performance computing, faculty at the Digital Computer Laboratory continued to conduct research in other fields of computing as well, such as in Human-Computer Interaction through the PLATO project, the first computer music (the ILLIAC Suite), computational numerical methods through the work of Donald B. Gillies, and James E. Robertson, the 'R' co-inventor of the SRT division algorithm, to name a few. Given this explosion in research in computing, in 1964, the University of Illinois reorganized the Digital Computer Laboratory into the Department of Computer Science, and by 1967, the department awarded its first PhD and master's degrees in Computer Science. In 1982, UIUC physicist Larry Smarr wrote a blistering critique of America's supercomputing resources, and as a result the National Science Foundation established the National Center for Supercomputing Applications in 1985. NCSA was one of the first places in industry or academia to develop software for the 3 major operating systems at the time – Macintosh, PC, and UNIX. NCSA in 1986 released NCSA Telnet and in 1993 it released the Mosaic web browser. In 2004, the Department of Computer Science moved out of the Digital Computer Laboratory building into the Thomas M. Siebel Center for Computer Science following a gift from alumnus Thomas Siebel.

Degrees and programs

Undergraduate
The department offers 14 undergraduate degree programs, all leading to Bachelor of Science degrees, through six different colleges:
 Computer Science (Engineering)
 Mathematics and Computer Science (Liberal Arts and Science)
 Statistics and Computer Science (LAS)
 Computer Science and Chemistry (LAS)
 Computer Science and Linguistics (LAS)
 Computer Science and Anthropology (LAS)
 Computer Science and Astronomy (LAS)
 Computer Science and Economics (LAS)
 Computer Science and Geography and Geographic Information Systems (LAS)
 Computer Science and Advertising (Media)
 Computer Science and Philosophy (LAS)
 Computer Science and Animal Sciences (Agricultural, Consumer, and Environmental Sciences)
 Computer Science and Crop Sciences (Agricultural, Consumer, and Environmental Sciences)
 Computer Science and Music (Fine and Applied Arts)

The department also sponsors a minor in computer science available to all UIUC students.

The department also offers two 5-year bachelors/masters programs through the College of Engineering: Bachelor of Science/Master of Science (B.S./M.S.) in Computer Science and Bachelors of Science/Masters of Computer Science(B.S./M.C.S.).

Graduate
 Doctor of Philosophy (Ph.D.)
 Master of Science (M.S.) in Computer Science
 Professional Masters of Computer Science (M.C.S.)
 Online MCS is offered in partnership with Coursera.
 MCS in Data Science(MCS-DS) Track is offered in partnership with the School of Information Science, the Department of Statistics, and Coursera
 Master of Science in Bioinformatics (M.S. Bioinformatics)

In popular culture
In the movie 2001: A Space Odyssey, the antagonist and sentient computer HAL 9000 says it was made operational at the HAL Plant in Urbana, Illinois which was meant to represent the Coordinated Science Laboratory where the ILLIAC project was conducted.

Notable faculty 
 Sarita Adve,  principal investigator for the Universal Parallel Computing Research Center
 Vikram Adve, helped to create LLVM along with Chris Lattner, Former Interim Head of the Department of Computer Science
 Gul Agha, director of the Open Systems Laboratory and researcher in concurrent computation
 Prith Banerjee, former senior Vice President of Research at Hewlett Packard and director of HP Labs
 Roy H. Campbell, Sohaib and Sara Abbasi Professor of Computer Science
 Herbert Edelsbrunner, recipient of the National Science Foundation's Alan T. Waterman Award
 David Forsyth, Professor of Computer Science
 C. William Gear, mathematician specialized in numerical analysis, computer graphics, and software development
 Donald B. Gillies, mathematician and computer scientist specialized in game theory and computer architecture
 Bill Gropp, Thomas M. Siebel Chair Professor, director of the National Center for Supercomputing Applications, and co-creator of Message Passing Interface, IEEE Computer Society President-Elect (2021)
 Jiawei Han,  Abel Bliss Professor specialized in data mining
 Michael Heath, director of the Center for the Simulation of Advanced Rockets and former interim department head (2007–2009)
 Thomas Huang, researcher and professor emeritus specialized in Human-Computer Interaction
 Ralph Johnson, Research Associate Professor and co-author of Design Patterns: Elements of Reusable Object-Oriented Software
 David Kuck, sole software designer on the ILLIAC IV and developer of the CEDAR project
 Steven M. LaValle, principal scientist at Oculus Rift
 Chung Laung Liu, Professor of Computer Science
 Ursula Martin, computer scientist specialized in theoretical computer science and formal methods and a Commander of the Order of the British Empire
 Bruce McCormick, professor of physics, computer science, and bioengineering
 Klara Nahrstedt, Ralph and Catherine Fisher Professor of Computer Science and director of the Coordinated Science Laboratory 
 David Plaisted, faculty at the Department of Computer Science until professorship at UNC-Chapel Hill 
 Daniel Reed, former department head (1996–2001) and former director of the National Center for Supercomputing Applications (2000–2003)
 Edward Reingold, specialized in algorithms and data structures
 Dan Roth, Professor of Computer Science
 Rob A. Rutenbar, Abel Bliss Professor and former department head (2010–2017), noted for advances in computer hardware
 Marc Snir, Michael Faiman and Saburo Muroga Professor of Computer Science and former department head (2001–2007)
 Shang-Hua Teng, Professor of Computer Science and Gödel Prize laureate
 Josep Torrellas, Willett Faculty Scholar in Computer Science and research faculty for the Universal Parallel Computing Research Center
 Marianne Winslett, professor emerita of computer science
 Stephen Wolfram, former Professor of Physics, Mathematics, and Computer Science and founder of Wolfram Research
 Frances Yao, Professor of Computer Science and staff at Xerox Palo Alto Research Center
 Yuanyuan Zhou, Professor of Computer Science and founder of Emphora, Pattern Insight, and Whova

Notable alumni
 Sohaib Abbasi B.S. 1978, M.S. 1980, former CEO of Informatica
 Nancy Amato Ph.D. 1995, Unocal Professor in the Department of Computer Science and Engineering at Texas A&M University, steering member of CRA-W, and current head of the Department of Computer Science, University of Illinois, Urbana-Champaign
 Daniel E. Atkins III Ph.D. 1970, Inaugural Director of the Office of Cyberinfrastructure for the U.S. National Science Foundation.
 Marc Andreessen B.S. 1993, Mosaic (web browser), Netscape
 Eric Bina M.S. 1988, Mosaic (web browser), Netscape
 Ed Boon B.S., Mortal Kombat
 Rick Cattell B.S. 1974, co-founder of Object Data Management Group, ACM Fellow, winner of the 1978 ACM Doctoral Dissertation Award
 Steve Chen B.S. 2002, YouTube
 Steve S. Chen Ph.D. 1975, Cray Computer
 Edward Davidson Ph.D. 1968, professor emeritus in Electrical Engineering and Computer Science at the University of Michigan, Ann Arbor
 Steve Dorner B.S. 1983, Eudora (email client)
 Brendan Eich M.S. 1986, JavaScript, Mozilla
 Clarence Ellis Ph.D. 1969, First African-American Computer Science Doctorate recipient and pioneer in Computer Supported Cooperative Work (CSCW) and Groupware
 Ping Fu M.S. 1990, Geomagic
 Mary Jane Irwin M.S. 1971, PhD. 1975, NAE member; computer architecture researcher
 Jawed Karim B.S. 2004, YouTube
 Robert L. Mercer M.S. 1970, Ph.D. 1972, co-CEO of Renaissance Technologies and pioneer in Computational Linguistics
 Marcin Kleczynski B.S. 2012, CEO and founder of Malwarebytes
 Pete Koomen M.S. 2006, co-founder and CTO of Optimizely
 Chris Lattner Ph.D. 2005, LLVM
 Der-Tsai Lee M.S. 1976, Ph.D. 1978, 14th President of National Chung Hsing University
 Max Levchin B.S. 1997, PayPal, Slide
 Nimit Maru B.S. 2004, co-founder and CEO of Fullstack Academy
 Robert McCool, B.S. 1995, author of the original NCSA HTTPd web server and the Common Gateway Interface (CGI)
 Mary T. McDowell B.S. 1986, former CEO of Polycom, former executive vice president at Nokia
 Peng T. Ong M.S. 1988, co-founder of Match.com
 Ray Ozzie B.S. 1979, Lotus Notes, Groove Networks, and former CTO and Chief Software Architect at Microsoft.
 Anna Patterson Ph.D. 1998, Vice President of Engineering, Artificial Intelligence at Google and co-founder of Cuil
 Linda Petzold  B.S. 1974, Ph.D. 1978, Professor of Computer Science and Mechanical Engineering at UC Santa Barbara, NAE member, and J. H. Wilkinson Prize for Numerical Software recipient; computational science and engineering researcher
 Fontaine Richardson Ph.D. 1968, founder of Applicon
 Thomas Siebel M.S. 1985, founder, chairman, and CEO of Siebel Systems; founder, chairman, and CEO of C3.ai
 Russel Simmons B.S. 1998, co-founder and initial CTO of Yelp, Inc and a member of the PayPal Mafia
 Anil Singhal M.C.S. 1979, co-founder and CEO of NetScout Systems
 James E. Smith M.S. 1974, Ph.D. 1976, winner of the 1999 Eckert–Mauchly Award
 Jeremy Stoppleman B.S. 1999, co-founder and CEO of Yelp, Inc.
 Parisa Tabriz B.S. 2005, M.S. 2007, computer security expert at Google and Forbes 2012 "Top 30 People Under 30 To Watch in the Technology Industry"
 Mark Tebbe  B.S. 1983, Adjunct Professor of Entrepreneurship at Booth School of Business at the University of Chicago and co-founder of Answers Corporation
 Andrew Yao Ph.D. 1975, Turing award winner, theoretical computer science researcher

See also
 Beckman Institute for Advanced Science and Technology
 Grainger College of Engineering

References

University of Illinois Urbana-Champaign
Computer science departments in the United States
1964 establishments in Illinois